Beaty is an unincorporated community in Benton County, Arkansas, United States. It is approximately 4.5 miles northwest of Gravette and 3.2 miles south of the Arkansas-Missouri state line.

References

Unincorporated communities in Benton County, Arkansas
Unincorporated communities in Arkansas